Vendado es Amor, no es Ciego is a 1744 zarzuela by José de Nebra, premiered in Madrid.

Recording
  Vendado es Amor, no es Ciego - Los Elementos, Alberto Miguelez Rouco  Glossa 2CD 2020

References

1744 operas
Zarzuelas
Spanish-language operas
Baroque compositions
Operas